Strelitzia juncea, the rush-leaved strelitzia or narrow-leaved bird of paradise, is a monocotyledonous flowering plant that is indigenous to South Africa. This drought-resistant Strelitzia occurs sparingly near Uitenhage, Patensie and just north of Port Elizabeth. It is threatened in part by illegal removal for horticultural purposes. This species is thought to be one of the most frost-resistant of the genus Strelitzia.

Other common names include strelitzia, bird of paradise, or crane flower though these names are also collectively applied to other species in the genus Strelitzia.

References

External links
 IPNI Listing

Flora of the Cape Provinces
Strelitziaceae
Taxa named by Henry Cranke Andrews